Pioneer is a census-designated place in Amador County, California. The community is in ZIP code 95666 and area code 209. The population was 1,094 at the 2010 census.

Pioneer Station, built approximately 1925, is located in Pioneer however, it was never a Pony Express stop, a popular fallacy. It was a general store selling gas, water, and offering camping sites. The old Pioneer Station still stands and is currently a private residence.

A post office opened in Pioneer in 1947.

Demographics
The 2010 United States Census reported that Pioneer had a population of 1,094. The racial makeup of Pioneer was 1,017 (93.0%) White, 0 (0.0%) African American, 34 (3.1%) Native American, 1 (0.1%) Asian, 2 (0.2%) Pacific Islander, 12 (1.1%) from other races, and 28 (2.6%) from two or more races. Hispanic or Latino of any race were 52 persons (4.8%).

The Census reported that 1,094 people (100% of the population) lived in households, 0 (0%) lived in non-institutionalized group quarters, and 0 (0%) were institutionalized.

There were 475 households, out of which 111 (23.4%) had children under the age of 18 living in them, 255 (53.7%) were opposite-sex married couples living together, 30 (6.3%) had a female householder with no husband present, 34 (7.2%) had a male householder with no wife present.  There were 25 (5.3%) unmarried opposite-sex partnerships, and 1 (0.2%) same-sex married couples or partnerships. 132 households (27.8%) were made up of individuals, and 67 (14.1%) had someone living alone who was 65 years of age or older. The average household size was 2.30.  There were 319 families (67.2% of all households); the average family size was 2.76.

The population was spread out, with 197 people (18.0%) under the age of 18, 55 people (5.0%) aged 18 to 24, 180 people (16.5%) aged 25 to 44, 400 people (36.6%) aged 45 to 64, and 262 people (23.9%) who were 65 years of age or older.  The median age was 51.3 years. For every 100 females, there were 97.5 males.  For every 100 females age 18 and over, there were 98.5 males.

The homeowner vacancy rate was 4.3%; the rental vacancy rate was 7.9%.  866 people (79.2% of the population) lived in owner-occupied housing units and 228 people (20.8%) lived in rental housing units.

Government

Points of interest
The scenery and environment around Pioneer includes a number of centuries-old tall pine trees and oak trees, as well as lakes for water sports and fishing.

 The Kirkwood Lake Tract is located near here.  
 Mace Meadow Golf Course - golf and restaurant
 Scenic Hwy 88 drive
 Outdoor Activities - boating, fishing
 Pioneer Park - tennis, basketball, baseball/softball, play structures, community center, etc.
 Pioneer Branch Library
 Molly Joyce Park - baseball, disc golf course

Climate
Area has a Köppen Climate Classification of Csb, which is a dry-summer subtropical climate often referred to as "Mediterranean".

See also
California State Route 88

References

Census-designated places in Amador County, California
Census-designated places in California